The South Branch Potomac River has its headwaters in northwestern Highland County, Virginia near Hightown along the eastern edge of the Allegheny Front.

Nomenclature
The Native Americans of the region, and thus the earliest white settlers, referred to the South Branch Potomac River as the Wappatomaka. Variants throughout the river's history included Wappatomica River, Wapacomo River, Wapocomo River, Wappacoma River, Wappatomaka River, South Branch of Potowmac River, and South Fork Potomac River.

Places settled in the South Branch valley bearing variants of "Wappatomaka" include Wappocomo farm built in 1774 and the unincorporated hamlet of Wappocomo (sometimes spelled Wapocomo) at Hanging Rocks, both north of Romney on West Virginia Route 28.

Course
The exact location of the South Branch's source is northwest of Hightown along U.S. Route 250 on the eastern side of Lantz Mountain (3,934 ft) in Highland County. From Hightown, the South Branch is a small meandering stream that flows northeast along Blue Grass Valley Road through the communities of New Hampden and Blue Grass. At Forks of Waters, the South Branch joins with Strait Creek and flows north across the Virginia/West Virginia border into Pendleton County.

The river then travels on a northeastern course along the western side of Jack Mountain (4,045 ft), followed by Sandy Ridge (2,297 ft) along U.S. Route 220. North of the confluence of the South Branch with Smith Creek, the river flows along Town Mountain (2,848 ft) around Franklin at the junction of U.S. Route 220 and U.S. Route 33. After Franklin, the South Branch continues north through the Monongahela National Forest to Upper Tract where it joins with three sizeable streams: Reeds Creek, Mill Run, and Deer Run.

Between Big Mountain (2,582 ft) and Cave Mountain (2,821 ft), the South Branch bends around the Eagle Rock (1,483 ft) outcrop and continues its flow northward into Grant County. At Petersburg, the South Branch Valley Railroad begins, which parallelsthe river until its mouth at Green Spring.

In its eastern course from Petersburg into Hardy County, the South Branch becomes more navigable allowing for canoes and smaller river vessels. The river splits and forms a series of large islands while it heads northeast to Moorefield. At Moorefield, the South Branch is joined by the South Fork South Branch Potomac River and runs north to Old Fields where it is fed by Anderson Run and Stony Run.

At McNeill, the South Branch flows into the Trough where it is bound to its west by Mill Creek Mountain (2,119 ft) and to its east by Sawmill Ridge (1,644 ft). This area is the habitat to bald eagles. The Trough passes into Hampshire County and ends at its confluence with Sawmill Run south of Glebe and Sector.

The South Branch continues north parallel to South Branch River Road (County Route 8) toward Romney with a number of historic plantation farms adjoining it. En route to Romney, the river is fed by Buffalo Run, Mill Run, McDowell Run, and Mill Creek at Vanderlip. The South Branch is traversed by the Northwestern Turnpike (U.S. Route 50) and joined by Sulphur Spring Run where it forms Valley View Island to the west of town.

Flowing north of Romney, the river still follows the eastern side of Mill Creek Mountain until it creates a horseshoe bend at Wappocomo's Hanging Rocks around the George W. Washington plantation, Ridgedale. To the west of Three Churches on the western side of South Branch Mountain, 3,028 feet (923 m), the South Branch creates a series of bends and flows to the northeast by Springfield through Blue's Ford. After two additional horseshoe bends (meanders), the South Branch flows under the old Baltimore and Ohio Railroad mainline between Green Spring and South Branch Depot, and joins the North Branch to form the Potomac.

Tributaries 
 Big Run (West Virginia)
 Buffalo Creek (West Virginia)
 Lunice Creek (West Virginia)
 Mill Creek (West Virginia)
 Mill Run (West Virginia)
 North Fork South Branch Potomac River (West Virginia)
 Mill Creek (West Virginia)
 Seneca Creek (West Virginia)
 South Fork South Branch Potomac River (West Virginia/Virginia)
 Kettle Creek (West Virginia)

North Fork South Branch Potomac River

From Circleville, the North Fork flows northeast through Pendleton County between the Fore Knobs  to its west and the River Knobs, 2,490 feet (759 m) to its east. At Seneca Rocks, the North Fork is met by Seneca Creek. From Seneca Rocks, the North Fork continues to flow northeast along the western edge of North Fork Mountain 3,389 feet (1033 m) into Grant County. Flowing east through North Fork Gap, the North Fork joins the South Branch Potomac at the town of Cabins, west of Petersburg.

South Fork South Branch Potomac River

From 1896 to 1929, it was named the Moorefield River by the Board on Geographic Names to avoid confusion with the South Branch.

See also
 List of crossings of the Potomac River § South Branch Potomac River

References 

 
 
Rivers of Virginia
Rivers of West Virginia
Monongahela National Forest
History of West Virginia
Tributaries of the Chesapeake Bay